Kopa MCB is an annual football domestic cup competition for teams on Bonaire. Until 2010 when the Netherlands Antilles was dissolved, teams from Bonaire competed against teams from Curaçao in the Netherlands Antilles Championship (Kopa Antiano). After gaining new politic status, no competition was held on Bonaire in 2011. The inaugural Kopa MCB was held in 2012. The competition is organized by the Bonaire Football Federation with naming rights purchased by Maduro & Curiel's Bank.

Champions

Results by team

References

Football competitions in Bonaire
National association football cups
Recurring sporting events established in 2012